Neda (born Tenielle Neda on May 31, 1987) is a Perth-based singer-songwriter signed with Island Records Australia, which is part of Universal Music Australia. Her folk-inspired EP Daylight Disguise was released in March 2013. Neda briefly appeared on Australian Idol in 2009 under the name Tenielle Muslin, where she made it into the top 24.

Career

Discography

EPs

Singles

References

External links 

 
 
 
 

1987 births
Living people
Australian women singer-songwriters
21st-century Australian singers
21st-century Australian women singers